The  (from French: "Emperor's Demise Act") was a law passed by the Sénat conservateur on 2 April 1814, which deposed Napoleon I as Emperor of the French.

Background 
Since the French Revolution had deposed Louis XVI, France had been almost constantly at war with most of Europe. Chronic political instability and the constant rumbles of war created a favourable terrain for a military coup, which General Bonaparte exploited on 18 Brumaire, establishing the French Consulate in the Constitution of the Year VIII, led by an equilateral triumvirate. Two years later, the Constitution was amended into the Constitution of the Year X, making Bonaparte First Consul for life. Finally, on 18 May 1804, the Sénat conservateur passed the Constitution of the Year XII. establishing an Emperor, Bonaparte, styling himself "Napoléon I, Emperor of the French". Napoleon was crowned emperor on 2 December 1804, inaugurating the First French Empire.

A series of Napoleon's disasters and conflicts like the Peninsular War the War of the Sixth Coalition, and the French invasion of Russia led to the near obliteration of the once overwhelming Grande Armée. By February 1814, the French Army was so depleted that, even after winning every battle of the Six Days' Campaign, it could not stop the march of the Allies on French soil on its route on Paris.

The Allies arrived at the outskirts of Paris in late March, and Talleyrand maneuvered to take upon himself to negotiate the capitulation of Marmont, who defended the capital. On 31 March, Talleyrand dined at his hotel with Frederick William III of Prussia and Alexander I of Russia, and pleaded for a Bourbon restoration, arguing that the Senate would support the plan.

Act 
On 1 April 1814, the Sénat conservateur elected Talleyrand chief of a five-member provisionary government.

The next morning, Talleyrand and Barthélemy, president of the Senate, proposed a motion to depose Napoléon and the House of Bonaparte, and call the Count of Provence to the throne as King Louis XVIII.

On 3 April, the Senate voted a text detailing its reasons for ousting Napoléon.  It charged the emperor with numerous violations of the Constitution of the Year XII, which it had itself approved over the years. The minutes of the meeting were published in Le Moniteur Universel of 4 April.

The final paragraph read:
The Senate declares and decrees as follows: 
1. Napoleon Buonaparte is cast down from the throne, and the right of succession in his family is abolished. 
2. The French people and army are absolved from their oath of fidelity to him. 
3. The present decree shall be transmitted to the departments and armies, and proclaimed immediately in all the quarters of the capital.

Aftermath 

On 11 April, after attempting to put his son on the throne, Napoléon abdicated unconditionally. The Allies allowed him to keep his title of Emperor, but exiled him to Elba. Napoléon attempted to return to power on 26 February 1815, leading to the Hundred Days. He was defeated at the Battle of Waterloo and imprisoned to the remote rock of Saint Helena for life.

In the following years, the Acte de déchéance de l'Empereur served as a litmus test of allegiance to the House of Bourbon.

Sources and references 

Napoleon